Butterfly Island is a 1985 Australian children's show. The first season cost $1.6 million, the second $3.2 million. This was the first mainstream Australian TV show where an Asian actor, David Phu An Chiem was given the lead role.

Cast 

 Grigor Taylor - Charlie Wilson
 Mouche Phillips - Jackie Wilson
 Penne Hackforth-Jones - Mary
 Louise Wallace
 Susanne Haworth - Laura
 Jonathan Hardy
 Mark Kounnas - Greg Wilson
 Nick Tate
 Peter Mochrie - Bob Gallio
 Patrick Phillips - Eric Davis
 Leon Cremor - Scotty
 David Phu An Chiem - Vo Diem

References

External links 

 Butterfly Island at IMDb
 Butterfly Island - Episode 1 at Australian Screen Online

Australian children's television series
1985 Australian television series debuts
1987 Australian television series endings
Australian Broadcasting Corporation original programming
Seven Network original programming